Back in Time is a 2015 American documentary film directed by Jason Aron. The film explores the production, impact, and legacy of the Back to the Future film series, and includes interviews with members of the series' cast and crew, including Robert Zemeckis, Steven Spielberg, Michael J. Fox and Christopher Lloyd, as well as fans of the franchise.

Synopsis 
The film includes footage of various cast and crew members of the Back to the Future film series, discussing the trilogy and its cultural impact. Among these interviewees are actors Michael J. Fox, Christopher Lloyd, Lea Thompson, Donald Fullilove, and Claudia Wells; filmmakers Robert Zemeckis, Bob Gale, and Steven Spielberg; musicians Huey Lewis and Alan Silvestri; fans of the films such as Dan Harmon, co-creator of the Back to the Future-inspired animated series Rick and Morty; and former head of Columbia Pictures, Frank Price. While delving into the legacy of the films themselves, the documentary also studies the cultural importance of the DeLorean, used as a time machine in the series, the technology involved in creating a real-life hoverboard, and the cast and crew's experiences during the pre-production, production, and post-production of the original film.

Production 
Back in Time began as a project conceived by Jason Aron, a fan of the Back to the Future series, that was posted to the crowdfunding website Kickstarter on June 26, 2013. Over 600 people backed the campaign, pledging over $45,000 in order for the documentary to be made. The film was shot over a period of two years; while production primarily took place in the United States, another filming location was that of London, England during a Back to the Future fan event. The film was released online on October 21, 2015, the day that the series' protagonist Marty McFly travels to in Back to the Future Part II. Shortly after its release, the documentary was added to the Netflix streaming service.

Critical reception
Gregory Weinkauf of The Huffington Post said that the documentary "gets to the heart of the Back to the Future phenomenon, proving as enjoyable as the franchise it affectionately explores", calling it "a delightful return to, and updating of, a beloved story". Reviewer Logan J. Fowler of the website Pop-Break noted that while the film's segment on the science of hover technology didn't "seem to gel in with the rest of the documentary", it was "a well crafted and awesome look back at the movie that changed so many lives in the past, and will continue to do so in the future".

References

External links 
 
 
 

2015 films
2015 documentary films
American documentary films
Documentary films about films
Films shot in London
Back to the Future (franchise)
Kickstarter-funded documentaries
2010s English-language films
2010s American films